Miss International Curaçao is the national female beauty pageant of Curaçao, along with Miss Curaçao and Señorita Curaçao.

History
Miss International Curaçao was held for the first time in 2014. The pageant was held in separate pageant since 2002 Miss Curaçao was stopped to send the delegate at the Miss International pageant. Curaçao was debuted at the Miss International occurred in 1971. Usually the winner, a runner-up or hand-picked delegate is sent as the national representative. Since 2003 the country did not send a candidate at the pageant in unknown reasons. In 2014 Curaçao will be represented by Chimay Ramos. Chimay Ramos replaces Kimberly Regales who was originally elected Miss Curaçao International on April 30, 2014. After 3 years of not participating at the Miss International pageant, Curaçao returns with Christhian Puesan as new owner of the license and appointed a former Miss Curaçao Universe, Chanelle de Lau, who end up 1st Runner-Up in Miss International 2017.

Titleholders
Color key

External links
 Miss Curaçao Official

Beauty pageants in Curaçao
Dutch awards
Recurring events established in 2014